Gareth Potts (born 30 June 1983) is an English three-time world champion eight-ball pool player, winning the WEPF World Eightball Championship in 2005, 2007 and 2008. He was also IPA World Blackball Professional Champion in 2014.

He also won the 2000 Junior World Pool Championships.

Potts won the Chinese 8 Ball Masters in 2013, beating Chris Melling 17-9 in the best-of-33 final.

He successfully defended the Chinese 8 Ball Masters in 2014 by beating Shi Hang-Qing 15-6 in a match lasting 2 hours and 10 minutes.

Potts had signed a contract with Joy Billiard so he can play in the Chinese 8 Ball Tournament. He is also sponsored by the Finnish chalk, glove and tip company TAOM Billiards. As of 2015, Potts has concentrated his career on Chinese 8 Ball pool.

From 2013 onwards, pool table retailer Home Leisure Direct announced they were Official Sponsor of Potts, and began offering coaching days, as well as instructional 'How to Play' video guides.

Potts joined the Ultimate Pool circuit in 2021. His first tournament win was PRO Series 7 (3-4 December 2021). In that tournament, he defeated Rob Wharne 7-4, Karl Sutton 7-6, Greg Batten 7-4, Chris Melling 7-5 and Shaun Storry 9-4.

References

1983 births
Living people
English pool players
World champions in pool
Sportspeople from Stoke-on-Trent